Rhynchopyga subflamma is a species of moth in the subfamily Arctiinae. It is found in Panama and Costa Rica.

References

Moths described in 1884
Euchromiina